Chirakkadavu  is a village in Kottayam district in the state of Kerala, India. The nearest town of Chirakkadavu is Kanjirappally. The main landmark of the place is Sree Mahadeva Temple. It is one of the temple included in 108 Siva Temples. Chirakkadavu East - Mannamplavu junction.

Demographics
 India census, Chirakkadavu had a population of 26263 with 13828 males and 14235 females.

References

 Kanjirappally.

Villages in Kottayam district